is a former JR West Kabe Line station located in Imaida, Kabe-chō, Asakita-ku, Hiroshima, Hiroshima Prefecture, Japan.  It closed on December 1, 2003 when operation of the line was discontinued/suspended between Kabe Station and Sandankyō Station.

History
1956-12-20: Imaida Station opens along with several other stations along the Kabe Line
1972-04-01: After Kabe-chō became part of Hiroshima City, the area around the station was renamed Imaida, Kabe-chō, Hiroshima
1973: Imaida Station becomes a Hiroshima City station
1980-04-01: After Hiroshima becomes a designated city, the area around the station is renamed Imaida, Kabe-chō, Asakita-ku, Hiroshima
1987-04-01: Japanese National Railways is privatized, and Kōdo Station becomes a JR West station
2003-12-01: Imaida Station closes along with the rest of the non-electrified section of the Kabe Line

Blue Station
Imaida Station was the setting for the Sonoko Kawai 1986-03-21 single . At the time Kawai was a member of the popular idol group Onyanko Club, and the single debuted at #1 on the Oricon charts, unseating a song by Onyanko Club.

Station building
Imaida Station features one side platform capable of handling one line, and featuring an enclosed waiting area.  The station was unmanned before this section of the Kabe Line was closed. The station building is located in a largely residential area, and is used as a meeting place despite the station name placard being removed.

Environs
The Ōta River is approximately 150 meters to the southeast of the station.

Highway access
 Hiroshima Prefectural Route 177 (Shimosa Higashi Route)
 Hiroshima Prefectural Route 267 (Utsu-Kabe Route)

Connecting lines
This information is historical as all stations on this part of the Kabe Line are currently suspended from regular service.
Kabe Line
Kōdo Station — Imaida Station — Aki-Kameyama Station

References
 可部線　今井田駅
 駅舎物語-今井田駅-
 ぶらり可部線　夏

Kabe Line suspended stations
Stations of West Japan Railway Company in Hiroshima city
Railway stations in Japan opened in 1956
Railway stations closed in 2003